Thermicanus aegyptius is a microaerophile and thermophilic bacterium from the genus Thermicanus, which has been isolated from oxic soil in Egypt.

References

Further reading

External links
Type strain of Thermicanus aegyptius at BacDive -  the Bacterial Diversity Metadatabase

Paenibacillaceae
Bacteria described in 2000
Thermophiles